The Very Best of Dolly Parton is a compilation album by Dolly Parton, released 7 March 2007. It sold platinum in the UK.

Track listing
 "9 to 5" - 3.00
 "I Will Always Love You" - 2.53
 "Islands in the Stream" (with Kenny Rogers) - 4:09
 "Jolene" - 2.41
 "Coat of Many Colors" - 3:04
 "My Tennessee Mountain Home" - 3:06
 "Here You Come Again" - 2:53
 "Baby I'm Burning" - 2.36
 "Love Is Like a Butterfly" - 2:20
 "The Bargain Store" - 2.42
 "Potential New Boyfriend" 3.36
 "Everything's Beautiful (in its own Way) (with Willie Nelson) 3.15
 "Silver Threads and Golden Needles (with Tammy Wynette & Loretta Lynn) - 2.34
 "To Know Him is to Love Him (with Linda Ronstadt & Emmylou Harris) - 3.49
 "Why'd You Come in Here Lookin' Like That" - 2.32
 "Romeo (with Billy Ray Cyrus, Mary Chapin Carpenter, Pam Tillis, Kathy Mattea and Tanya Tucker)" - 3.34
 "Tennessee Homesick Blues" - 3.23
 "Dumb Blonde" - 2.28
 "Apple Jack" - 3.25
 "Old Flames Can't Hold a Candle to You" - 3.24

Charts

Weekly charts

Year-end charts

Certifications

References

2007 compilation albums
Dolly Parton compilation albums